Wilson Community College is a public community college in Wilson, North Carolina. It was established in 1958 and is part of the North Carolina Community College System.

History 
Wilson Community College (WCC) is a member of the North Carolina Community College System. Established in 1958 as Wilson Industrial Education Center, it is one of the system’s oldest institutions. The first classes began September 29, 1958 in the Charles L. Coon High School Annex. In 1964, the State Board of Education granted authority to award the Associate in Applied Science Degree and the school name was changed to Wilson County Technical Institute. In 1969, the Institute was accredited by the Southern Association of Colleges and Schools. The name was officially changed to Wilson Technical Community College in 1989. In 1993, the Department of Community Colleges granted the College the authority to award the Associate in Arts degree. In 1997, the College converted from the quarter system to the semester system. This change was made in the entire North Carolina Community College System to enhance the transferability of students to four-year institutions. In 2007, the official name of the College was changed to Wilson Community College.

Buildings and construction
Construction began on the first building on the current site in 1958. Throughout the years since, many buildings have been added and updated to provide more space for additional programs, a student lounge, a bookstore, and more. In 1997, the Salvatore DelMastro auditorium was completed, allowing the old auditorium to be converted to additional library facilities. The Frank L. Eagles Community Business Center addition to Building G was completed in 2003, adding much needed meeting rooms and classrooms to the College facilities. In 2009, the College opened a new student center that showcased sustainable technologies. In March 2019, the newly-renovated Lee Technology Center opened. In 2021, the Library was renovated and renamed as the A. Dwight Johnson Learning Resource Center. Future renovations are currently being planned on both the Herring Avenue and Lee Technology Center campuses. The College continues to expand programs, facilities, and services, to meet the needs of the community.

*data from 2018 Campus Facilities report

Presidents
 1958 – 1971 – Salvatore DelMastro
 1971 – 1982 – Ernest B. Parry
 1982 – 2003 – Frank L. Eagles
 2003 – 2015 – Rusty Stephens
 2015 – present – Tim Wright

Early colleges
Wilson Early College Academy (WECA) was established August 5, 2009 on the campus of Wilson Community College. Wilson Academy of Applied Technology (WAAT) was established in 2016 and is embedded on the Beddingfield High School campus and the Wilson Community College campus. Plans are underway for construction of a new building for WAAT, on site at the Lee Technology Center.

References

External links 

Two-year colleges in the United States
North Carolina Community College System colleges
Education in Wilson County, North Carolina
Universities and colleges accredited by the Southern Association of Colleges and Schools
Educational institutions established in 1958
Buildings and structures in Wilson County, North Carolina
1958 establishments in North Carolina